The 2022 Ball State Cardinals men's volleyball team represents Ball State University in the 2022 NCAA Division I & II men's volleyball season. The Cardinals, led by 1st year head coach Donan Cruz, play their home games at Worthen Arena. The Cardinals are members of the Midwestern Intercollegiate Volleyball Association and were picked to finish fourth in the MIVA in the preseason poll.

Roster

Schedule

 *-Indicates conference match.
 Times listed are Eastern Time Zone.

Broadcasters

Maryville: Baylen Hite & Amber Seaman
Tusculum: No commentary
George Mason: Baylen Hite & Amber Seaman
Hawai'i: Joel Godett & Amber Seaman
Hawai'i: Joel Godett & Kevin Owens
BYU: Jarom Jordan, Steve Vail & Kiki Solano
BYU: Jarom Jordan, Steve Vail, & Kiki Solano
Lewis: Cody Lindeman, Juliana Van Loo, & Ally Hickey
McKendree: Colin Suhre
Purdue Fort Wayne: Baylen Hite & Kevin Owens
Loyola Chicago: No commentary
Lindenwood: No commentary
Quincy: Joel Godett & Lloy Ball
NJIT: Ira Thor
Princeton: Adam Dobrowolski & Melina Mahood
Ohio State: Brendan Gulick & Hanna Williford
Ohio State: No commentary
Quincy: No commentary
Lindenwood: Michael Wagenknecht & Sara Wagenknecht
McKendree: Donnie Harmon, Nathan Ganger, & Dominick Liacone
Lewis: No commentary
Loyola Chicago: Scott Sudikoff & Kris Berzins
Purdue Fort Wayne: Mike Maahs
MIVA Quarterfinal- Quincy: Baylen Hite, Jordan Kilmes, & Lexi Eblen
MIVA Semifinal- Lewis: Joel Godett, Kevin Owens, & Madison Surface
MIVA Championship- Purdue Fort Wayne: Joel Godett, Amber Seaman, & Madison Surface

Rankings 

^The Media did not release a pre-season poll.

Honors
To be filled in upon competition of the season.

References

2022 in sports in Indiana
2022 NCAA Division I & II men's volleyball season
2022 team
Ball State